Randy Pierce may refer to:
 Randy Pierce (ice hockey), Canadian ice hockey player
 Randy G. Pierce, Supreme Court of Mississippi judge